Dakosaurus is an extinct genus of crocodylomorph within the family Metriorhynchidae that lived during the Late Jurassic and Early Cretaceous. It was large, with teeth that were serrated and compressed lateromedially (flattened from side to side). The genus was established by Friedrich August von Quenstedt in 1856 for an isolated tooth named Geosaurus maximus by Theodor Plieninger in 1846. Dakosaurus was a carnivore that spent much, if not all, its life out at sea. The extent of its adaptation to a marine lifestyle means that it is most likely that it mated at sea, but since no eggs or nests have been discovered that have been referred to Dakosaurus, whether it gave birth to live young at sea like dolphins and ichthyosaurs or came ashore like turtles is not known. The name Dakosaurus means "biter lizard", and is derived from the Greek  ("biter") and  - ("lizard").

Discovery and species 
 
 
The type species Dakosaurus maximus, meaning "greatest biter lizard", is known from fossil discoveries in Western Europe (England, France, Switzerland and Germany) of the Late Jurassic (Late Kimmeridgian-Early Tithonian).

When isolated Dakosaurus teeth were first discovered in Germany, they were mistaken for belonging to the theropod dinosaur Megalosaurus. The type species D. maximus was originally named as a species of Geosaurus in 1846 by Theodor Plieninger, creating the species G. maximus.

In 1856 von Quenstedt made Plieninger's Geosaurus maximus teeth a new genus with the name Dakosaurus. He explained the etymology as Greek dakos "Biss" [bite] in 1858 in German, adding "denn wenige kommen seinem furchtbaren Gebiss gleich" [for few can match its terrible set of teeth]. He gave the meaning of Greek dakos more correctly as "Beisser" [biter] in another description in 1859 in which he classified Dakosaurus as a dinosaur.

Named in 1871 by Emanuel Bunzel, the remains attributed to Megalosaurus schnaitheimi (found in Schnaitheim, Germany) are now believed to have belonged to Dakosaurus maximus as per Carrano et al. (2012).

Fossil specimens referrable to Dakosaurus are known from Late Jurassic deposits from England, France, Switzerland, Germany, Poland, Russia, Argentina, and Mexico. Teeth referrable to Dakosaurus are known from Europe from the Oxfordian.

Dacosaurus (Sauvage, 1873) is a misspelling of Dakosaurus, and thus a synonym.

Dakosaurus andiniensis, meaning "biter lizard from the Andes", was first reported in 1985 from the Neuquén Basin, a very rich fossil bed in the Vaca Muerta, Argentina. However, it was not until 1996 that the binomen Dakosaurus andiniensis was erected. Two later discovered skulls, the specimina MOZ 6146P and MOZ 6140P, have indicated that D. andiniensis is unique among the metriorhynchids (the family of stem-crocodilians most specialised for marine life) with its short, tall snout, which lent it the popular nickname "Godzilla" in press reports about its description. This species has a fossil range from the late Jurassic to early Cretaceous (Late Tithonian-Early Berriasian).

Dakosaurus nicaeensis, named in 1913 by Ambayrac, was mistakenly classified as a megalosaurid dinosaur; now it is assigned as the sole species in the genus Aggiosaurus. Buffetaut  in 1982 demonstrated that it was in fact a metriorhynchid, closely related to, if not a member of Dakosaurus. As the type specimen is poorly preserved it is considered nomen dubium.

Incomplete skull specimens of Dakosaurus have been discovered in Kimmeridgian age rocks from Mexico; they have not yet been referred to a specific species of Dakosaurus.

Description
 
Its body was streamlined for greater hydrodynamic efficiency, which along with its finned tail made it a more efficient swimmer than modern crocodilian species.

Classification

Dakosaurus–when it contained the species D. andiniensis, D. maximus, and D. manselii–had long been considered paraphyletic, that is, not consisting of a common ancestor and its descendants, until a 2012 study moved D. manselii to the formerly invalid genus Plesiosuchus.

Palaeobiology

Salt glands 
The incomplete skull specimens from the Mexican species of Dakosaurus preserves the chamber in which the well-developed salt glands (known from Geosaurus and Metriorhynchus) would have been housed. Unfortunately, there was no preservational evidence of the glands themselves.

Diet
Dakosaurus was the only marine crocodyliform to have evolved teeth that are both lateromedially compressed and serrated; not only that, but they were much larger than those of metriorhynchid genera. These characteristics, along with their morphology,  which fall within the 'Cut' guild of Massare (1987) - and are analogous to modern killer whale teeth - indicate that Dakosaurus was an apex predator.

The enlarged supratemporal fenestrae of Dakosaurus skulls would have anchored large adductor muscles (jaw closing), ensuring a powerful bite. As their skulls are triangular in shape, with deeply rooted large, serrated teeth and a bulbous, deep mandibular symphysis (like pliosaurs), dakosaurs would also have been able to twist feed (tear chunks of flesh off potential prey).

Palaeoecology 

Dakosaurus maximus is one of several species of metriorhynchids known from the Mörnsheim Formation (Solnhofen limestone, early Tithonian) of Bavaria, Germany. Alongside three other metriorhynchid species, it has been hypothesised that niche partitioning enabled several species of crocodyliforms to co-exist. Dakosaurus and Geosaurus giganteus would have been top predators of this Formation, both of which were large, short-snouted species with serrated teeth. The remaining two species (Cricosaurus suevicus and Rhacheosaurus gracilis) and the teleosaurid Steneosaurus would have fed mostly on fish.

From the slightly older Nusplingen Plattenkalk (late Kimmeridgian) of southern Germany, both D. maximus and C. suevicus are contemporaneous. As with Solnhofen, Dakosaurus was the top predator, while C. suevicus was a fish-eater.

See also

List of marine reptiles

References

External links 
 Scientists reveal prehistoric terror - CNN
 Illustration - National Geographic

Prehistoric pseudosuchian genera
Prehistoric marine crocodylomorphs
Late Jurassic crocodylomorphs
Late Jurassic crocodylomorphs of North America
Jurassic Mexico
Fossils of Mexico
Early Cretaceous crocodylomorphs of South America
Jurassic Argentina
Cretaceous Argentina
Fossils of Argentina
Late Jurassic crocodylomorphs of Europe
Jurassic France
Fossils of France
Jurassic Spain
Fossils of Spain
Jurassic Switzerland
Fossils of Switzerland
Cretaceous United Kingdom
Fossils of Great Britain
Solnhofen fauna
Fossil taxa described in 1856